The Toledo Progressive Party was a minor political party in Belize. It contested the 1979 elections, but received just 96 votes and failed to win a seat. It did not contest any further elections.

References

Defunct political parties in Belize